Ronnie Stevens may refer to:

 Ronnie Stevens (actor), British actor
 Veronica Stevens, American female wrestler, sometimes known as "Ronnie" Stevens